Bouthayna Shaya (born in Sweida, Syria) is a Syrian television actress and voice actress.

Early life 
Born in Sweida area in Syria graduated from the Higher Institute of Theatrical Arts in 1989 and has a chorus Directed by theater.

Filmography

Television 
Spider Web
Justice Tower
The mother

Radio 
Amazing phenomena
The rule of justice
Novelist figures
The story in a representative

Plays 
Sunbath day
Voices of the Depths
Waiting for Godot

Dubbing roles 
Honō no Dōkyūji: Dodge Danpei
Topo Gigio
Captain Tsubasa
Tico of the Seven Seas
Dragon Quest: Dai no Daibōken
Dog of Flanders
Muka Muka Paradise
Romeo's Blue Skies
Baby & Me
Pokémon - Ash Ketchum (first voice)
Digimon Adventure - Yamato Ishida, Agumon
Digimon Adventure 02
Digimon Tamers
Ginga Sengoku Gun'yūden Rai
Bakusō Kyōdai Let's & Go!! - Retsu Seiba (Venus Centre version)
Animaniacs - Slappy Squirrel
Floral Magician Mary Bell
Fist of the North Star
Kiteretsu Daihyakka
D.I.C.E. - Jet Siegel
Hamtaro - Oxnard
The Looney Tunes Show - Patricia Bunny (Syrian dub)
Ultimate Top Plate - Son Tae-yang
Doraemon (1979) - Shizuka Minamoto
Pretty Rhythm - Kei Asechi
Spacetoon Interactive

External links 

Bouthayna Shaya at ElCinema

Living people
1964 births
Syrian television actresses
Syrian voice actresses
20th-century Syrian actresses
21st-century Syrian actresses
Syrian stage actresses
Syrian radio actresses
Syrian television presenters